BBO may stand for:
Barium boron oxide, another name of barium borate
Big Bang Observer, planned space gravitational wave observatory
IATA code for Berbera Airport
"BBO (Bad Bitches Only)", a song by Migos featuring 21 Savage, from the album Culture II
Beta barium borate (β-BaB2O4) crystal
Black Bag Operations
Bundesbahn Österreich, a former name for the Austrian Federal Railways
Bureau Bijzondere Opdrachten, a Dutch secret service during World War II
Bridge Base Online, a website for learning and playing bridge
British Ballet Organization, a dance teaching and examination board
Broome Bird Observatory
BBO, the ICAO code for Flybaboo